{{Taxobox
| name = Bacteriophage AP205
| virus_group = iv
| realm = Riboviria
| regnum = Orthornavirae
| phylum = Lenarviricota
| classis = Leviviricetes
| ordo = Norzivirales
| familia = Duinviridae
| genus = Apeevirus
| species = Bacteriophage AP205}}Bacteriophage AP205 is a bacteriophage that infects Acinetobacter bacteria. Contains a genome linear of positive single-stranded RNA. The bacteriophage belongs to the genus Apeevirus of the Duinviridae'' family and is the type species of the family.

References 

Bacteriophages